Gil Kim (born December 20, 1981) is an American baseball executive and coach for the Toronto Blue Jays of Major League Baseball (MLB). He is their field coordinator and director of player development.

Kim played college baseball at Middlebury College and Vanderbilt University before embarking on a professional baseball career in the Netherlands, China, Australia, Spain, and Venezuela. In 2010, Kim became a scout for the Texas Rangers of MLB in Mexico, and later in the Dominican Republic. He was promoted to their director of international scouting in 2014, before being hired as the director of player development for the Blue Jays in 2016. He became a coach in 2020.

Playing career
Kim attended Pottsville Area High School in Pottsville, Pennsylvania, and played for the school's baseball, soccer, and basketball teams. He played in an international tournament in Puerto Rico during his sophomore year. Kim transferred to Lawrenceville School after his sophomore year, which he repeated. He was named All-State in baseball for three years at Lawrenceville. Kim attended Middlebury College for one year, and played college baseball for the Middlebury Panthers, and then transferred to Vanderbilt University. He played for the Vanderbilt Commodores, receiving 21 at bats in three seasons, recording one single. He graduated from Vanderbilt with a Bachelor of Arts in history in 2006.

Kim began his professional baseball career for the Omron Pioneers in a Dutch baseball league. He then played for the Beijing Tigers of the China Baseball League and the Western Districts Bulldogs in the Greater Brisbane League in Australia. In 2008, he played for FC Barcelona's baseball team in Spain, and then joined his manager with the Tiburones de La Guaira of the Venezuelan Professional Baseball League.

Executive and coaching career
Kim interned for the Pittsburgh Pirates of Major League Baseball in 2009 for three months before he was hired by the Texas Rangers as an area scout covering Mexico in 2010. He and Tony LaCava scouted Roberto Osuna. He also scouted for the Rangers in the Dominican Republic. In 2014, the Rangers promoted Kim to director of international scouting.

In January 2016, the Blue Jays hired Kim to be their first director of player development. In 2020, the Blue Jays promoted Kim to the major league coaching staff, while keeping his role as director of player development. In 2022, the Blue Jays named Kim the field coordinator.

Personal life
Kim's parents Yongcheol and Soonae were born in Korea; he was born in Philadelphia. Kim and his wife married in December 2015.

References

External links
Career statistics and player information from The Baseball Cube

1981 births
Living people
Baseball players from Philadelphia
Middlebury Panthers baseball players
Vanderbilt Commodores baseball players
Beijing Tigers players
Texas Rangers scouts
Toronto Blue Jays executives
Toronto Blue Jays coaches
American baseball players of Korean descent
American expatriate sportspeople in China
Expatriate baseball players in China
American expatriate sportspeople in Spain
American expatriate baseball players in Australia
American expatriate baseball players in Venezuela
Tiburones de La Guaira players
Lawrenceville School alumni
American expatriate baseball people in Mexico
American expatriate baseball people in the Dominican Republic